Arthur Spaenhoven (9 April 1934 – 2 April 1996) was a Belgian wrestler. He competed in the men's Greco-Roman 57 kg at the 1968 Summer Olympics.

References

1934 births
1996 deaths
Belgian male sport wrestlers
Olympic wrestlers of Belgium
Wrestlers at the 1968 Summer Olympics
Sportspeople from Antwerp
People from Hoboken
20th-century Belgian people